

Roman republic/Roman empire

Poets (by date of birth)
 Lucretius (94 - 49 BCE)
 Catullus (84 -54 BCE)
 Virgil (Oct. 15, 70 - Sept. 21, 19 BCE)
 Gallus (69 - 26 BC), Egypt
 Horace (Dec. 8, 65 - Nov. 27, 8 BC)
 Tibullus (54 - 19 BCE)
 Propertius (50 - 15/2 BCE), Bevagna
 Ovid (Mar 20, 43 BCE - 17 CE)

Unknown Date:

 Sulpicia - the only woman poet of Ancient Rome whose works survive
 Meleager of Gadara

Works
 Meleager of Gadara gathers an anthology of short poems and epigrams that would become the basis for the Greek Anthology

South Asia

Works
 The Pali Canon is first written down (estimated)
 The Tolkappiyam, a Tamil grammar written in verse

China

Poets (by year of birth)
 Yang Xiong (53 BCE - 18 CE)

Korea

Poets (by year of birth)
 Yuri of Goguryeo, (reigned c. 17 BCE to 18 CE)

References

Poetry
Poetry by century